A list of films produced in the Soviet Union in 1958 (see 1958 in film).

1958

See also
1958 in the Soviet Union

External links
 Soviet films of 1958 at the Internet Movie Database

1958
Soviet
Films